Rusty Cooley (born April 27, 1970) is an American guitarist, known for his highly refined guitar technique. He is regarded as one of the fastest guitarists in the United States and a master of the shredding technique of guitar. Guitar Player magazine called him "the leading light of the post-Malmsteen shred-volution."

Early life
Cooley received his first equipment (a Peavey T27 guitar and a Peavey Decade amp) on his fifteenth birthday. From that day on he immersed himself in music, practicing upwards of four hours a day. He took guitar lessons for a while but became dissatisfied with local guitar instructors and decided to become self-taught. He relied on instructional books and videos like Doug Marks's Metal Method, Ted Greene's Chord Chemistry and Modern Chord Progressions books, REH instructional videos, and Robben Ford's instructional DVDs.

His early musical influences were guitarists Randy Rhoads, Yngwie Malmsteen, Steve Vai, Paul Gilbert, Vinnie Moore and Tony MacAlpine.

After only three years of playing, he became a guitar teacher at the music store where he had purchased his first guitar.

After high school Cooley went to the local college and studied music theory.

Solo work
Cooley was unsatisfied with local musicians and began to work on solo music in early 1996. He began playing seven-string guitars exclusively at this time.

His debut solo album was the self-titled Rusty Cooley, released in 2003 by Lion Music. It consists of 12 tracks, one of which, "Under the Influence", was released as a video as well. The album featured Cooley on guitar, Brent Marches on bass, Eric Sands on fretless bass, and Bobby Williamson on keyboards. Music was by Cooley, Marches, and Kelly Carpenter; Carpenter also wrote the lyrics for, and handled the vocals on, the vocal versions of "Dominion" and "The Machine". Programming was done by Cooley and Williamson, while guitar engineering was done by Sands. Cooley also was in charge of production.

Track listing

Currently
Cooley has collaborated with ProTone Pedals, testing their new Jason Becker Perpetual Burn Signature distortion pedal, as Becker himself has suffered from ALS since 1990, and as such, is no longer able to play guitar. ProTone Pedals has posted several videos of Cooley testing prototype versions of the pedal on YouTube . One of these video features a comment from Cooley himself, citing Becker as one of his biggest influences and stating that working on the pedal was something he considered an honor. ProTone has more recently been working on a Rusty Cooley Signature pedal. Cooley has collaborated with Dean Guitars to produce a signature seven-string model, of which several versions exist.

Cooley's lead work was featured on Arnold Schwarzenegger-themed parody metal band Austrian Death Machine's second album, Double Brutal.

Cooley is currently working with a new band, Day of Reckoning.

Teaching
Cooley has been a guitar instructor since his third year of playing. He has released five instructional products, done lessons for magazines (such as his "Metal Guru" column) and posted many lessons on sites such as Shredaholic. He has taught for the National Guitar Workshop three times (1996, 1997, 1998) and given many clinics. Cooley has many successful students, such as Chris Storey/Cris Osuna (ex-All Shall Perish) and Mica Roth, former member of Hybreed.

Endorsements
Currently Cooley endorses Ormsby Guitars, EMG Pickups, Morley Pedals, GHS strings, VHT, Rocktron, Eventide, Maxon and more recently Randall Amplification.

He previously endorsed Jackson Guitars, Ibanez Guitars and Dean Guitars.

His signature Dean model was released at NAMM in early 2007. It features a super-strat style body with a deeply sculpted lower horn (in order to perform the widest stretches when playing in high positions), EMG 707 pickups, volume control and a three-way switch.

In 2011 Dean Guitars released an eight-string version as well. Nicknamed the "Dean RC-8", it has the same features of the seven string version but with the implementation of a fanned fretting system and EMG 808 pickups.

Appeared on the podcast Cyber Timebite in April 2019

Releases

Music
Rusty Cooley - Rusty Cooley (2003, Lion Music)
Book of Reflections - Book of Reflections (2004, MCD, Lion Music)
Outworld - Outworld (2006, Replica Records)
Outworld - "Promo 2008" (2008, self-released)
All Shall Perish - Awaken the Dreamers (2008, Nuclear Blast, guest)
Austrian Death Machine - Double Brutal (2009, Metal Blade Records, guest)
Derek Sherinian - Molecular Heinosity (2009, InsideOut Music, guest)
The Sean Baker Orchestra - Baker's Dozen (2009, Lion Music, guest)
After the Burial - In Dreams (2010, Sumerian Records, guest)
 Michael Angelo Batio - Intermezzo (2013, M.A.C.E., guest)
Rings of Saturn - Infused (2014, Unique Leader Records, guest)

Instructional products
 Shred Guitar Manifesto (2000, DVD, Chops From Hell)
 Extreme Pentatonics (2001, DVD, Chops From Hell)
 The Art of Picking (2001, DVD, Chops From Hell)
 Rusty Cooley Performance/Clinic (2003, DVD, Chops From Hell)
 Rusty Cooley Performance/Clinic 2 (2003, DVD, Chops From Hell)
 Basic Training (2007, DVD, Chops From Hell)
 Rusty Cooley Fret Board Autopsy - Scales, Modes & Patterns Level 1 (DVD, 2008, Rock House Method)
 Rusty Cooley, Fret Board Autopsy - Scales, Modes & Patterns Level 2 (DVD, 2008, Rock House Method)
 Arpeggio Madness: Insane Concepts & Total Mastery (DVD, 2011, Rock House Method)

Television appearances
 Stay Tuned
 Metallurgy Live
 Metallurgy Unplugged
 World Class Guitar Techniques
 Robb's Metal Works
 Rusty Cooley's Guitar Asylum TV

References

Additional sources

External links
 Official website
 Biography from Cooley's official website
 Rusty Cooley Vvdeos
 Music video for "Under the Influence"
 Interview
 Outworld Message Board - Ask Rusty
 GUITAR GODS: Rusty Cooley (2003 interview)

1970 births
American heavy metal guitarists
Eight-string guitarists
Seven-string guitarists
Living people
Lead guitarists
Progressive metal guitarists
Musicians from Houston
Guitarists from Texas
21st-century American guitarists